Within Buddhist mythology, Sadashkana (Kharosthi: 𐨮𐨿𐨐𐨞𐨆‎𐨯𐨡) according to the gold plate inscription of Senavarman, mentions Sadashkana as the Devaputra (son of god), son of maharaja rayatiraya Kujula Kataphsa (Kujula Kadphises):
"Maharaja rayatiraya Kuyula Kataphsaputra Sadashkano devaputra"
"The son of god Sadashkano, son of the Great king and king of kings, Kujula Kaphises"

He was the son of the founder of Kushan empire and his brother was Sadaṣkaṇa, their next generation was Kanishka. The Chinese Book of Later Han 後漢書 chronicles gives an account of the formation of the Kushan empire based on a report made by the Chinese general Ban Yong to the Chinese Emperor c. 125 AD:

The Kushans were one of five branches of the Yuezhi confederation, a possibly Iranian or Tocharian, Indo-European nomadic people who migrated from Gansu and settled in ancient Bactria. Ban Gu's Book of Han tells us the Kushans (Kuei-shuang) divided up Bactria in 128 BC. Fan Ye's Book of Later Han "relates how the chief of the Kushans, Ch'iu-shiu-ch'ueh (the Kujula Kadphises of coins), founded by means of the submission of the other Yueh-chih clans the Kushan Empire, known to the Greeks and Romans under the name of Empire of the Indo-Scythians."

See also
 Indo-Greek kingdom 
 Kushan empire

References

"Ancient Indian inscriptions", S.R. Goyal, p. 92-93

Kushan Empire